The Magic Face is a 1951 American drama film directed by Frank Tuttle and written by Mort Briskin and Robert Smith. The film stars Luther Adler, Patricia Knight, William L. Shirer, Jaspar von Oertzen, Anton Mitterwurzer and Peter Preses. The film was released on August 13, 1951 by Columbia Pictures.

Plot

Cast          
Luther Adler as Rudi Janus / Janus the Great / Adolf Hitler
Patricia Knight as Vera Janus
William L. Shirer as Himself
Jaspar von Oertzen as Maj. Fritz Weinrich
Anton Mitterwurzer as Hans 
Peter Preses as Warden Harbacker
Manfred Inger as Heinrich Wagner
Charles Koenig as Franz 
Rolf Wanka as Gen. Rodenbusch 
Oskar Willner as Gen. von Schlossen 
Bell as Gen. Haldes
Eric Zuckmann as Heinrich Himmler
Hermann Erhardt as Hermann Göring 
Hans Sheel as Gen. Steig
Michael Tellering as Lt. Col. Heitmeier
Erik Frey as Col. Raffenstein
Heinz Moog as Hans Harbach
Ilka Windish as Carla Harbach
Annie Maier as Mariana

References

External links
 

1951 films
English-language Austrian films
1950s English-language films
American drama films
Austrian drama films
1951 drama films
Columbia Pictures films
Films directed by Frank Tuttle
Films about Adolf Hitler
Films about actors
Films scored by Herschel Burke Gilbert
Cultural depictions of Hermann Göring
Cultural depictions of Heinrich Himmler
American black-and-white films
1950s American films